Rudolf Geiter (18 April 1913 – 30 September 1978) was an Austrian football forward who played for Austria. He also played for Wiener Sport-Club and Grasshopper Zürich.

External links

1913 births
1978 deaths
Austrian footballers
Austria international footballers
Association football forwards
Wiener Sport-Club players
Grasshopper Club Zürich players